Mihr is the deity of the light of heaven and the god of Sun in ancient Armenian mythology. The worship of Mihr was centered in a region named Derjan, a district in Upper Armenia, currently located in eastern Turkish territories. The temple dedicated to Mihr was built in the locality of Bagayarich. Despite the fact that the Armenian Mihr was less prominent in Armenia than Mithra was in Persia, Mihr is the root of many Armenian proper names such as Mihran, Mihrdat and Mehruzhan. The Armenian pagan temple Mehian also has the same source. The month of February was dedicated to Mihr and it was called Mehekan. In 301 A.D. Christianity became the official religion of Armenia, and the Armenian church adopted many pagan rites and ceremonies. For example, the Christian fire-festival of Trndez, which has pagan roots, is still celebrated in February, the month dedicated to Mihr.

Triad in Armenian paganism
According to Vahan Kurkjian, the ideology behind the Armenian paganism has no Avestan trait, because the notion of the ideal did not exist in Mazdeism. The ideology of the latter was based on the struggle between light and dark. However, the Armenians erected statues to honor the sun and the moon. Furthermore, Armenian paganism is characterized by the worship of a Triad. The Urartians worshipped three great gods: Haldis, Theispas, and Artinis. The same notion existed in Armenian Zoroastrianism, in which the Triad consisted of Aramazd, Anahit, and Mihr.

See also
Mitra
Mithra

References

Bibliography 

Armenian gods
Solar gods